Discommunication e.p. is a mini-album by Japanese rock band 9mm Parabellum Bullet released on October 10, 2007.

Track listing

References 

2007 EPs
9mm Parabellum Bullet albums